Belvidere is an unincorporated community in Franklin County, Tennessee, United States. The zip code is 37306. Belvidere is a name of Italian origin meaning "beautiful sight". A post office has been in operation in Belvidere since 1870.

References

Unincorporated communities in Franklin County, Tennessee
Unincorporated communities in Tennessee